YGM may refer to:
 Gimli Industrial Park Airport's IATA airport code
 Muratayak language's ISO 639 code
 YGM Trading, the parent company of Aquascutum
 "YGM", a song by Atmosphere from Strictly Leakage